Tim Maurice Johnson (born February 7, 1978) is a former gridiron football linebacker. He was signed by the Baltimore Ravens as an undrafted free agent in 2001. He played college football at Youngstown State. Johnson was also a member of the Chicago Bears, Oakland Raiders and Calgary Stampeders.

Professional career
Tim Johnson is most known for his impression of teammate Shannon Sharpe on HBO's first season of Hard Knocks in 2001, his Blocked Punt for the Oakland Raiders against Tampa Bay Buccaneers in Super Bowl XXXVII which was returned for a touchdown and was awarded Special Teams Player Of The Year by teammate Jerry Rice.

Coaching career
Johnson later returned to his alma mater Youngstown State where he was hired as Director of Player Personnel. At a February 27, 2021 game against the Northern Iowa Panthers, Johnson lowered his shoulder and hit a UNI player that was running out of bounds. Johnson was banned from the sidelines for the remainder of the season action.

References

External links
Just Sports Stats
Baltimore Ravens bio

1978 births
Living people
Players of American football from Birmingham, Alabama
American football linebackers
American players of Canadian football
Canadian football linebackers
East Mississippi Lions football players
Youngstown State Penguins football players
Baltimore Ravens players
Chicago Bears players
Oakland Raiders players
Calgary Stampeders players
African-American players of Canadian football
Rhein Fire players
21st-century African-American sportspeople
20th-century African-American sportspeople